The Cook Islands Christian Church (CICC) is the largest religious denomination in the Cook Islands. It belongs to the Reformed family of churches. The CICC is a Christian Congregationalist church and has approximately 18,000 members, including around half of the residents of the Cook Islands. The church also has congregations in New Zealand and Australia.

History

The CICC has its origins in the work of the London Missionary Society (LMS), which began work in the Cook Islands in 1821. In 1852, the LMS founded the Cook Islands LMS Church. The church became autonomous in 1968 with the passage of the Cook Islands Christian Church Incorporation Act by the Parliament of the Cook Islands. This Act officially changed the church's name to the Cook Islands Christian Church. The first president of the CICC after the Act was passed was Bill Marsters, who in the late 1970s was forced to resign his position when he became involved in a scandal involving church funds that went missing.

Modern day

In 1978, the CICC established its first congregation in Auckland in order to accommodate church members who had emigrated to New Zealand. Today, there are 24 congregations in the Cook Islands, and 22 churches in New Zealand and 15 in Australia. The church employs 74 pastors, who are trained at Takamoa Theological College on Rarotonga. The CICC is a member of the World Council of Churches.

With the passage of the Cook Islands Christian Church Amendment Act by the Parliament of the Cook Islands in 2003, the CICC is permitted to alter its constitution without any action from Parliament.

The church has sister church relations with the Uniting Church in Australia, Presbyterian Church of Aotearoa New Zealand, the Congregational Union of New Zealand and the Maói Protestant Church.

Presidents

External links 
Official website

Notes 

Congregationalist denominations
Members of the World Council of Churches
Christianity in the Cook Islands
Religious organizations established in 1852
Christian organizations established in 1968
Reformed denominations in Oceania
Christian denominations established in the 19th century
1852 establishments in the Cook Islands
1968 establishments in the Cook Islands